An overhead cable is a cable for the transmission of information, laid on utility poles. Overhead telephone and cable TV lines are common in North America. These poles sometimes carry overhead power lines for the supply of electric power. Power supply companies may also use them for an in-house communication network. Sometimes these cables are integrated in the ground or power conductor. Otherwise an additional line is strung on the masts. 

Cables are arranged on poles with the most dangerous cables, that is, those carrying power, strung highest. Overhead cable systems also include a number of different components for managing signal cables. These include splicing systems that allow multi-conductor cables for distributing telephone signals and snowshoe-shaped devices for reversing the direction of cables.

When metal-based telephone wires are strung on the same utility poles as the power lines, they can pick up noise from the power line. Modern fiber optic telephone cable has the advantage that it can be strung next to power lines without interference.

In heavily populated regions of the UK, the only overhead cable that would be visible is the telephone line. Power cables and fiber-optic cables that deliver television and broadband services are buried underground. The lesser populated regions of the UK, the countryside for example, will have overhead power cables. Although it is safer to keep the cables underground, it would be difficult to repair a line if a fault were to develop.

See also 
 Aerial cable
 Optical ground wire
 Optical attached cable

Signal cables
Telecommunications infrastructure